Welch-Nicholson House and Mill Site is a historic home and grist mill site located near Houstonville, Iredell County, North Carolina.  The house was built about 1795, and is a two-story, one-room deep, transitional Georgian / Federal style frame dwelling.  It has a gable roof, a double shouldered brick chimney, shed rooms across the rear, and a shed roofed front porch.  Also on the property are contributing two-story frame barn, log corn crib, and the remains of the Welch-Nicholson House mill and dam.

It was added to the National Register of Historic Places in 1980.

References

Houses on the National Register of Historic Places in North Carolina
Georgian architecture in North Carolina
Federal architecture in North Carolina
Houses completed in 1795
Houses in Iredell County, North Carolina
National Register of Historic Places in Iredell County, North Carolina